Dinshaw Wacha Road is a road in Mumbai, India located between Churchgate and Mantralaya.

The road is also known as Dinshaw Varcha Road.

Points of interest 
Some institutions along this road are:

• Kishinchand Chellaram College of Arts, Science & Commerce; popularly known as KC College.

• Hassaram Rijhumal College of Commerce and Economics; popularly known as HR College.

• Kishinchand Chellaram Law College; popularly known as KC Law College.

• Cricket Club of India; popularly known as CCI

References

Roads in Mumbai